The Second Battle of Sirte (on 22 March 1942) was a naval engagement in the Mediterranean Sea, north of the Gulf of Sidra and southeast of Malta, during the Second World War. The British convoy was composed of four merchant ships, escorted by four light cruisers, one anti-aircraft cruiser and 17 destroyers. The Italian force comprised a battleship, two heavy cruisers, one light cruiser and ten destroyers. Despite the initial British success at warding off the Italian squadron, the Italian Fleet attack delayed the convoy's planned arrival before dawn, which exposed it to intense air attacks that sank all four merchant ships and one of the escorting destroyers in the following days.

Background

Malta

Three convoys to Malta in 1941 suffered the loss of only one merchant ship. From January 1941 to August 1942,  ships had delivered  but  had been sunk and modern, efficient, merchant ships, naval and air forces had been diverted from other routes for long periods; 31 supply runs by submarines had been conducted. Reinforcements for Malta included  and dangerous aircraft carrier ferry operations to deliver fighters. Loaded ships sailing to Africa accounted for 90 per cent of the ships sunk and Malta-based squadrons were responsible for about 75 per cent of the ships sunk by aircraft. Military operations from Malta and using the island as a staging post, led to Axis air campaigns against the island in 1941 and 1942..

By early 1942 the Allies had lost the initiative in the central Mediterranean as Italian and German forces isolated Malta and made plans to remove it as a threat. After a series of Allied defeats, the Italian Navy achieved naval superiority in the central Mediterranean by spring 1942. As Malta was running short of aircraft, anti-aircraft guns, fuel, food and ammunition, convoy MW10 sailed from Alexandria on 21 March. The British expected opposition from German and Italian aircraft as well as Italian surface units. In December 1941, the two battleships ( and ) stationed in the eastern Mediterranean had been disabled by an attack by Italian frogmen, leaving the fleet with only cruisers and destroyers. The next day, the squadron aborted the operation and returned to port—the carriers were unable to launch aircraft reinforcements to Malta due to defective long-range fuel tanks. The escort of convoy MW10 relied heavily on destroyers—including lighter-built destroyer escorts—to provide anti-submarine protection and included the anti-aircraft cruiser . More destroyers and another light cruiser were sent from Malta.

British plan
Admiral Sir Philip Vian, commanding the convoy, organised his ships into six divisions plus a close escort of five Hunt-class destroyers for the convoy .
 3rd Division: destroyers  and 
 4th Division: light cruisers  (flagship) and 
 6th Division: anti-aircraft cruiser  and Hunt-class destroyer 

In case of an Italian surface attack, the first five divisions were to stand off from the convoy to face the enemy while the sixth division laid smoke across the wake of the convoy to obscure it. The first five divisions would act as a rearguard to lay smoke and delay the  while Carlisle and the Hunt-class destroyers proceeded with the cargo ships to Malta.

Battle

At 14:30 the next day, the British were faced by a pair of heavy cruisers and escorting destroyers. Admiral Vian immediately implemented his plan; the cargo ships and escorts turned away to the south while the light cruisers and remaining destroyers laid smoke and charged the Italians. After an exchange of fire, the two Italian heavy cruisers backed off in an attempt to lure the British toward the incoming main Italian squadron, and at 16:37 they returned to attack with the battleship , a light cruiser and their screening destroyers. The battle raged for two and a half hours, with the British ships leaving the safety of their huge smoke screen to fire a few volleys and then returning to it when the Italian salvos got too close. During one of these exchanges,  suffered heavy damage from a near-miss when fired at by the Italian battleship, and was ordered to withdraw from the battle line and join the convoy. None of the torpedoes found their targets, but as  turned she was hit hard by a round which penetrated her boiler room, ignited a fire and temporarily brought her to a halt. The battle began with a  wind blowing to the North-west, with the wind continuing to increase during the day; a factor which favoured the gunnery of the larger Italian ships throughout the battle, but the direction of the wind aided the laying of smokescreens by Vian's ships.

 was also struck by shell splinters from the battleship's main guns that pierced a bulkhead, causing some flooding but no casualties. At 18:55, Littorio had been hit by a 4.7 in (120 mm) shell, with negligible damage. Her floatplane caught fire from the blast from a salvo of her after turret at the same time. This led to the claim by the British that one of the torpedoes struck home. At dusk, before 19:00, the Italians gave up and turned for home. Without radar, they would have been at a significant disadvantage in a night action, as in the Battle of Cape Matapan. The Italians outgunned their British counterparts but they appeared unwilling to close for a decisive blow, perhaps wary of the torpedo threat from the numerically superior British destroyer force.

Aftermath

Analysis
Almost all authors have assessed the battle as a British victory, credited to the escort of light cruisers and destroyers which prevented the Italians from damaging the convoy by repulsing an Italian squadron composed of a battleship and two heavy cruisers during massed Axis air attacks. Some authors, while generally acknowledging the British success, write of the battle as a partial Italian achievement in delaying and turning the convoy aside. Nearly all sources acknowledge that the Italian fleet inflicted significant damage and several casualties on the British squadron while suffering minimal damage and no casualties in return. Axis aircraft caught the British convoy at sea, chased the surviving steamers to the harbour and more than 80 per cent of the supplies were lost. The British convoy operation was a strategic failure.

Order of battle

Admiral Angelo Iachino
 1 battleship: 
 2nd division, Admiral Angelo Parona
 2 heavy cruisers: , 
 1 light cruiser: 
 Submarine:

Merchant Navy

 Merchant ships (all sunk by 26 March)
 Clan Campbell
 Breconshire
 Pampas
 Talabot

Royal Navy
 Carlisle squadron
  (C-class light cruiser) 
 5th Destroyer Flotilla (Hunt-class destroyer escorts) from Tobruk:  (sunk by a mine on 23 March),  (lost en route to submarine  20 March)

 15th Cruiser Squadron (Admiral Vian)
 3 light cruisers: ,  (slightly damaged),  (seriously damaged)
 22nd Destroyer Flotilla: ,  (severely damaged),  (seriously damaged),  (slightly damaged),  (structural damage due to high speed manoeuvring)

 Malta squadron
 1 cruiser: ;
 1 destroyer:  (damaged by near miss during air attack on 23 March, sunk by air attack on 26 March while awaiting repair)
 3 submarines: ,  and 

 From Alexandria
 Parthian-class submarine

Battle damage
According to British reports, " was struck on the after part of the bridge at 16:44" by a  hit from the light cruiser ; 16 seamen were killed. According to Admiral Iachino, the hit was instead achieved by Littorio's secondary guns, based on the range between the opposite warships. Kingston was hit amidships by a shell from Littorio that killed 15 men of her crew. and left the destroyer dead in the water, with her starboard whaleboat torn apart, her anti-aircraft guns, searchlight tower and torpedo launchers shattered by the explosion. Some sources claim that she was hit by the guns of the heavy cruiser .

Although Kingston had an engine in flames and a flooded boiler, she managed to get back up to speed, reaching Malta the next day. Havock was also badly damaged in a boiler by a near miss from Littorio at 17:20; eight sailors died. Lively was forced to retreat to Tobruk for repairs at 18:55, after a near miss' splinter from Littorios aft turret holed her hull, resulting in some flooding. Three more destroyers—,  and —suffered lesser damage from  cruiser fire. The British cruisers had replied with 1,553 rounds and the destroyers with about 1,300 rounds as well as 38 torpedoes. Axis aircraft made continual attacks, mainly against the convoy, throughout the naval action and Royal Navy AA gunners claimed the destruction of seven Axis aircraft and damage to several more.

Subsequent operations

[[File:HMS Kingston (F64).jpg|thumb|right|Destroyer HMS Kingston suffered heavy damage from Littorio'''s main guns during the battle, and while in drydock at Malta she was successively attacked by German bombers which further damaged her, this time beyond repair.]]
Most of the escort force, now short of fuel and ammunition due to the protracted engagement and unable to find the convoy, turned back for Alexandria.
The damaged destroyers and the cargo ships were sent on to Malta, with Carlisle, Penelope and Legion. The next day, they were subjected to continuous air attacks. The cargo ship Clan Campbell was sunk twenty miles from harbour, and the oil tanker Breconshire was too damaged to reach Valletta. Nonetheless, the other two merchantmen, Talabot and steamer Pampas, reached Malta's Grand Harbour virtually unharmed. Pampas had been hit by two bombs but these failed to explode. Penelope attempted to tow Breconshire, but the tow parted in heavy seas.
She anchored short of the protective minefields and the destroyer Southwold attempted to take her in tow, hitting a mine in the process. She was eventually towed into Marsaxlokk Bay by tugs.

Intense Axis air raids against Malta on 24–25 March failed to damage the three surviving convoy ships. However, on 26 March, German dive bombers scored bomb hits on all three ships, sinking Talabot and Pampas that day with Breconshire capsizing on 27 March. Much of Breconshire′s oil was salvaged through the hole in her hull. The Italian fleet units were no more lucky after the battle. While under repair in dry dock at Malta, Kingston was attacked a few days later by German aircraft and suffered further damage, this time beyond repair. She was scrapped in situ in the following months. Whilst in dock at Malta, Havock, was a target for Axis aircraft and sustained further damage. On 3 April the ship was ordered to Gibraltar before her repairs were complete. Havock ran aground off Kelibia, Tunisia, in the Strait of Sicily on 6 April and was wrecked, with one crewman killed in the incident. Her crew and passengers were interned by the Vichy French at Laghouat in the Sahara but were released in November as a result of Operation Torch.

See also
 Malta convoys
 Margit Johnsen
 The Ship (1943) by C. S. Forester is a fictionalised account of the battle, seeing the action through the eyes of the crew of a Royal Navy light cruiser "HMS Artemis" (it is dedicated to "the officers and ship's company of H.M.S. Penelope"). It depicts the Italians as inept and cowardly, even though deploying a superior force of two battleships, three heavy and four light cruisers; but it seems fairly accurate on the action (while overstating the accuracy of British fire) and gives an excellent account of the roles of different crew members. Published in 1943, the novel did have a propaganda/morale-raising aspect, stressing that everyone's efforts were important, and not mentioning the loss of merchant ships afterwards. Forester, best known for his Hornblower R.N. novels, sailed with both the British and American navies during the Second World War to gather material.

Footnotes

Sources
 Bauer, Eddy; James L. Collins, Jr; and Peter Young: The Marshall Cavendish Encyclopedia of World War Two. Marshall Cavendish, 1985. .
 Bradford, Ernle: Siege: Malta 1940–1943, William Morrow and Company, Inc., New York, 1986. .
 Bragadin, Marc'Antonio: The Italian Navy in World War II, United States Naval Institute, Annapolis, 1957. .
 Cunningham, Andrew: A Sailor's Life, New York, 1955.
 Greene, Jack & Massignani, Alessandro: The Naval War in the Mediterranean, 1940–1943, Chatam Publishing, London, 1998. .
 Gigli, Guido: La Seconda Guerra Mondiale. Laterza, 1964. 
 Guglielmotti, Umberto: Storia della marina italiana. V. Bianco, 1961 
 Harwood, Admiral Sir Henry H., Despatch on the Battle of Sirte 1942 Mar. 22., Supplement to the London Gazette, 18 September 1947.
 Holland, James: Fortress Malta: An Island Under Siege, 1940–1943, Miramax Books, New York, 2003. .
 Hough, Richard Alexander:The longest battle: the war at sea, 1939–45. Weidenfeld and Nicolson, 1986
 Jellison, Charles A.: Besieged: The World War II Ordeal of Malta, 1940–1942, University Press of New England, 1984. .
 Llewellyn, M. J.: The Royal Navy and the Mediterranean Convoys: A Naval Staff History, Naval Staff History series, Routledge, London, 2007. .
 Macintyre, Donald: The Battle for the Mediterranean. Norton ed., New York, 1965.
 O'Hara, Vincent P.: Struggle for the Middle Sea, Naval Institute Press, Annapolis, Maryland, 2009. .
 
 
 
 Sadkovich, James: The Italian Navy in World War II, Greenwood Press, Westport, 1994. .
 Secchia, Pietro: Enciclopedia dell'antifascismo e della Resistenza. La Pietra, 1989.
 Shores, Christopher and Brian Cull with Nicola Malizia: Malta: The Spitfire Year, 1942. Grub Street, London, 1991. .
 Sierra, Luis de la: La guerra naval en el Mediterráneo, 1940–1943, Ed. Juventud, Barcelona, 1976. . 
 Simpson, Michael: A life of Admiral of the Fleet Andrew Cunningham. A Twentieth-century Naval Leader. Routledge Ed., 2004. .
 Stephen, Martin; Grove, Erik: Sea Battles in Close-up: World War Two. Naval Institute press, 1988. .
 Thomas, David A.: Malta Convoys, Leo Cooper Ed., South Yorkshire, 1999. .
 Wilmott, Ned & Fowler, Will: Strategy & tactics of sea warfare. Marshall Cavendish, 1979. 
 Woodman, Richard: Malta Convoys, 1940–1943'', Jack Murray Ltd., London, 2000. .

Further reading

External links
  Royal Navy official despatches relating to the battle, written shortly after the battle, but not published until after the war. Also available as a single pdf file at ibiblio.org
 The 2nd Battle of the Sirte
 Seconda Battaglia della Sirte – 
 Main page with link to sources (scroll down and open link to Bibliografia)
 "Our Navy in Action" video newsreel film 

1942 in Libya
Sirte, Second
Gulf of Sidra
Sirte, Second
Malta Convoys
March 1942 events
Maritime incidents in Libya
Sirte
Sirte